The Women's kumite 50 kg competition at the 2015 European Games in Baku, Azerbaijan was held on 13 June 2015 at the Crystal Hall.

Schedule
All times are Azerbaijan Summer Time (UTC+5).

Results
Legend
KK — Forfeit (Kiken)

Elimination round

Group A

Group B

Finals

References

External links

Women's kumite 50 kg
Euro